The German Federal Bureau of Aircraft Accident Investigation (BFU) is the German federal agency responsible for air accident and incident investigation. 

The purpose of BFU is to find out the causes of air accidents and incidents and how they can be prevented. The BFU facility is located in Braunschweig, Lower Saxony. The agency is subordinate to the Federal Ministry of Transport.

West Germany joined the Convention on International Civil Aviation including the standards and recommended practices on aircraft accident and incident investigation (Annex 13) in 1956. Initially subordinate to the neighbouring Luftfahrt-Bundesamt (Federal Aviation Office), the Bureau of Aviation Accident Investigation according to a recommendation by the International Civil Aviation Organization in 1980 was put under the direct authority of the Federal Ministry of Transport. The BFU was formally established as an upper-level federal agency in 1998.

See also

Aviation accidents and incidents
Aviation safety

References

External links 
 BFU website

Aviation organisations based in Germany
Organizations investigating aviation accidents and incidents
Federal Bureau of Aircraft Accidents Investigation
Organisations based in Braunschweig
German federal agencies
1998 establishments in Germany
Organizations established in 1998